José Alberto Peixoto da Silva (born 5 December 1958 in Guimarães), known as Juanico, is a Portuguese retired footballer who played as a central midfielder.

References

External links

1958 births
Living people
Sportspeople from Guimarães
Portuguese footballers
Association football midfielders
Primeira Liga players
Liga Portugal 2 players
Segunda Divisão players
Clube Caçadores das Taipas players
F.C. Vizela players
Varzim S.C. players
Rio Ave F.C. players
C.F. Os Belenenses players
F.C. Penafiel players
Moreirense F.C. players
G.D.R.C. Os Sandinenses players
Portugal international footballers